Ecuadattus is a genus of Ecuadorian jumping spiders that was first described by J. X. Zhang & Wayne Paul Maddison in 2012.

Species
 it contains four species, found only in Ecuador:
Ecuadattus elongatus Zhang & Maddison, 2012 – Ecuador
Ecuadattus napoensis Zhang & Maddison, 2012 – Ecuador
Ecuadattus pichincha Zhang & Maddison, 2012 – Ecuador
Ecuadattus typicus Zhang & Maddison, 2012 (type) – Ecuador

References

Salticidae genera
Salticidae
Spiders of South America